Oakwell is a multi-purpose sports development in Barnsley, South Yorkshire, England used primarily by Barnsley Football Club for playing their home fixtures, and those of their reserves.

While the name 'Oakwell' generally refers to the main stadium, it also includes several neighbouring venues which form the facilities of the Barnsley FC Academy, an indoor training pitch, a smaller stadium with seating on the south and west sides for around 2,200 spectators, and several training pitches used by the different Barnsley FC squads.

Oakwell was the first stadium in English football to have a designated stand for disabled supporters.

Until 2003 the stadium and the vast amount of land that surrounds it were owned by Barnsley Football Club themselves; however, after the club fell into administration in 2002, the council purchased the main Oakwell Stadium to allow the club to pay its creditors and remain participants in the Football League.

West Stand

The stand is made up of two tiers, with only the upper tier covered, but at the expense of several supporting columns for the roof structure. The seats are the originals from the early 1900s, and from here you get a decent view with moderate legroom. In spite of the restricted views and modest facilities, the West Stand remains a popular vantage point for many fans. The lower tier of the West Stand is uncovered and offers a great view of the action.

The roof of the West Stand is corrugated iron. This also houses the main television gantry, which is accessed from the upper-tier seating area by a temporary ladder.

At the end of the 1990s, the then stadium owners Barnsley Football Club were considering re-developing the West Stand after several seasons of high attendances; however, with the rapid decline in fortunes of the football club, subsequent sale of the stadium and new club ownership, these plans are unlikely to come to fruition in the near future.

The stand also incorporates a traditional players' tunnel in the center. While this is used for access to some of the facilities underneath the stand, the main players' tunnel now feeds out from the north-west corner, following the relocation of the changing rooms to the North Stand.

The West Stand has a total seating capacity of 4,752.

On 7 September 2021, the club announced that the stand would be closed to spectators until further notice due to numerous safety concerns, therefore the capacity of the stadium dropped from 23,287 to 18,515, the stand only will remain open to broadcasters and the media during this time, with season tickets holders relocated to other parts of the stadium.

East Stand

The East Stand is a two-tier development, completed in 1993.  Funded in part by the football trust, the stand has a capacity of 7,492 and replaced a large covered terrace known as the Brewery Stand. The East Stand was designed by NYP Architects, as was the North Stand and the Corner Stand.  With the completion of the East Stand, Barnsley FC became the first football club in Yorkshire to incorporate 'executive boxes' into their stadium.

Because of the sloped land on which Oakwell Stadium is built, the rear of the East Stand is much taller than it is from the pitch side, meaning that a climb to the upper-tier seating area requires many more steps than a spectator may anticipate; however, several lifts are available.

CK Beckett Stand

Built in 1995, CK Beckett is the current name for what is traditionally known as the 'Pontefract Road End' or 'Ponty End'.  Some fans continue to call it the 'ORA Stand', in reference to its original sponsors. It is also known as the Van Damme Stand.

With a capacity of 4,508, the CK Beckett Stand is a large covered single-tier seating area behind the goal on the south side of the stadium.

This part of the stadium also houses the club superstore, the box office, and general administration offices.

North Stand

The North Stand is the most recent addition to Oakwell Stadium and is a large covered singled-tiered seating area with a capacity of 6,257 spectators.

As this stand is generally reserved for away supporters, its full capacity is rarely utilized.

At a cost of £4.5 million (including several academy facilities that it accommodates), it has been a cause for debate ever since its construction. However, at the time it was built, Barnsley had only just been relegated from the FA Premier League and were planning for a possible return.

Wakefield Audi Corner Stand

Built in the summer of 1998 and originally known as 'The Welcome Windows Stand', the structure provides further executive areas and disabled facilities for viewing an event.

Access to this area was also incorporated into the neighbouring East Stand on several levels; the spectator capacity of the structure is 202.

In August 2015 Barnsley announced the new sponsor of the stand, renaming it to the Brittania Drilling Limited Stand. However, on 9 October 2018, the sponsor changed yet again, to Wakefield Audi.

Other uses

In recent years Oakwell Stadium has rarely been used by anyone other than Barnsley FC, apart from the occasional 'celebrity' charity football match.

Wakefield Trinity Wildcats rugby league club used the stadium for their first game in the Super League in 1998.

Non-league football club Wakefield and Emley used the stadium for an FA Cup tie against Rotherham in 1998, choosing a larger neutral venue as opposed to the traditional option of 'switching' the tie to the home of the team which was drawn away.

Premier League side Manchester City used the stadium for their first qualifying round UEFA Cup game in July 2008, since the pitch at the City Of Manchester Stadium was unsuitable for football after the summer's commercial activities, such as boxing and music concerts, and was being re-turfed.

Tragedy
On 27 December 1920, Horace Fairhurst, a full-back for the visiting Blackpool,  received a blow to the head during the league encounter. He died at home eleven days later as a result of the injury.

Transport
Barnsley Interchange, with rail services to Sheffield, Leeds, Wakefield, Chesterfield, Nottingham, and Huddersfield, is around half a mile from Oakwell, or around a ten-minute walk, mostly uphill.

Notes

External links

 Photographs and details of Oakwell Stadium
 Satellite image of Oakwell

Barnsley F.C.
Football venues in England
Buildings and structures in Barnsley
Football venues in South Yorkshire
Sport in Barnsley
Premier League venues
Sports venues completed in 1887
English Football League venues